Bele Višnje (Serbian Cyrillic: Беле Вишње, trans. White Sour Cherries) was a Serbian and Yugoslav rock band formed in Čačak in 1962. Bele Višnje are notable for being one of the pioneers of the Yugoslav rock scene.

History

1962-1973
The band was formed in Čačak in the autumn of 1962 by Aleksandar Slaviković "Gušter" (guitar), Ljubodrag Jovanović "Borovac" (bass guitar), Zoran Sokić "Sole"(keyboards), Mišo Ilić (rhythm guitar), Dragan Maksimović (drums), Slobodan Pajić "Pajo" (vocals) and Muhamed Hukić "Hujo" (vocals). At the second half of 1963, Ilić was replaced by Stevo Radović (rhythm guitar, vocals), Maksimović was replaced by Predrag Radonjić, and Sokić switched from keyboards to bass guitar. This would become the band's most successful lineup. Prior to the arrival of Radović the band performed covers only, and after he joined the band, they started working on their own songs.

During their initial years Bele Višnje performed mostly covers of Little Richard, the Shadows and the Beatles. They regularly performed on dances in Čačak and nearby cities, holding regular Thursday dances in Učiteljski dom hall in Čačak. On March 8, 1964, the band performed, alongside band Iskre, singer Miki Jevremović, actor Mija Aleksić and Boris Radak's ballet company, on the celebration of Fifth Belgrade Gymnasium anniversary.

In March 1965, Radonjić had to leave the band due to his mandatory army stint, so Slobodan Pajić took over the drummer duties. On the first Belgrade Gitarijada festival, held on 9 January 1966, the band performed first, starting their performance with a cover of the folk song "Crne oči, curo, imaš" ("You Have Dark Eyes, Girl"). On the festival the band won the seventh place, which gave them opportunity to perform at bigger concerts. In the autumn of 1966, Sokić and Pajić left the band, deciding to dedicate themselves to their studies. During 1966, the band started to performed the song "Plavokosa" ("Blond Haired Girl"), which saw success with the audience. Several years later the song was, under slightly different title, "Plavuša", recorded by Kićo Slabinac (who served the army with Radović in Titograd), who achieved nationwide popularity with it. With the new bass guitarist, Miki Vukadinović, Bele Višnje performed on the second Belgrade Gitarijada festival, held on 23 January 1967. The band performed a cover of the Bosnian folk song "Moj dilbere" ("My Darling") and the song "Tango" and won the third place.

During the following years, the band changed the lineup several more times; Slobodan Rabrenović (guitar), Jovan Matijašević (bass guitar), Vladimir Šunjevarić (guitar), Zoran Branković (bass guitar) and Dragan Todorović (guitar and vocals) all passed through the band. In 1972 the band recorded their only 7-inch single, featuring the songs "Čips hit" ("Chips Hit") and "Čarobne oči" ("Magical Eyes"), releasing it through Diskoton. During the following year, Bele Višnje disbanded.

Post breakup
After Bele Višnje Disbanded, Slaviković performed in the band Crni Biseri. After 1974, he performed as a member of Đorđe Marjanović's and Miki Jevremović's backing bands, performing on several Soviet Union tours. In 1980 he withdrew from the scene.

Reunions
The band reunited in 1990. The lineup featured Stevo Radović (rhythm guitar, vocals), Predrag Radonjić (drums), Slobodan Pajić (vocals), Vladimir Šunjarević (guitar) and Jovan Matijašević (bass guitar). As there were no recordings of the band's songs from the 1960s, in 1994 the band, on the initiative of Smak guitarist Radomir Mihajlović Točak, recorded their old songs, and released them on the audio cassette Pesme naše mladosti (Songs of Our Youth) through Zvuci Galaksije record label. The album was produced by Mihajlović. In 2005 Pesme naše mladosti was reissued on CD by the same record label.

In November 2010, the band reunited to perform on a celebration of fifty years of rock music in their hometown Čačak.

Aleksandar Slaviković died Belgrade on October 23, 2017.

Discography

Studio albums
Pesme naše mladosti (1994)

Singles
"Čips hit" / "Čarobne oči" (1973)

References

External links
Bele Višnje at Discogs

Serbian rock music groups
Yugoslav rock music groups
Beat groups
Musical groups from Čačak
Musical groups established in 1962
Musical groups established in 1973
1962 establishments in Yugoslavia